The , conventional long names  and , —popularly known as  owing to the color of their uniforms— was an armed urban police force of Spain established by the Francoist regime in 1939 to enforce the repression of all opposition to the regime. Its mission was "total and permanent vigilance, as well as repression when deemed necessary."

In its first years of operation the corps was inadequately equipped in armament and vehicles but this situation would be steadily straightened out.

History 
Following the overthrow of the Second Spanish Republic in April 1939, the Francoist Spain initially relied on the Army in order to handle public order issues. By means of two sets of laws issued on 3 August 1939 and 8 March 1941 the Spanish State reorganized the police forces of Spain and established the Armed Police as a gendarmerie style national armed police that could be used to suppress disturbance of the public order and political organization in urban areas. Armed and trained for this purpose, it was intended to provide a more effective force for internal security duties in the large cities of Spain than the Guardia Civil that operated mainly in rural areas.

At the time of the Spanish coup of July 1936 that marked the onset of the Spanish Civil War most of the members of the preceding equivalent corps, the Guardia de Asalto had stayed loyal to the Republican government and many of their units fought valiantly in the battlefronts against the Nationalists. This display of loyalty towards the Spanish Republic brought about the disbandment of the corps by General Franco at the end of the Civil War. The members of the Guardia de Asalto who had survived the war and the ensuing Francoist purges were made part of the Policía Armada, the corps that replaced it.

The  was placed under the Directorate-General of Security (Dirección General de Seguridad) of the Spanish Ministry of the Interior (Ministerio de la Gobernación) and operated in most large population centers in Spain. Towards the last phase of the Francoist State it had earned a wide reputation as a ferocious corps, especially in the largest cities such as Madrid, Barcelona, Bilbao and Valencia, as well as the industrial areas of Spain such as parts of Asturias and the Basque country, where its well-equipped anti-riot units were ruthless and effective in quelling demonstrations by university students and workers that were often very large.

In the months after the death of the caudillo the Armed Police actively cracked down on protests and political rallies, continuing the infamous riot control operations of the Francoist State. The effort, however, revealed itself hopeless for the brutal and harsh image of the corps could not be improved and in 1979 the Armed Police was replaced by the Cuerpo Nacional de Policía (National Police Corps), later civilianized in a 1986 merger with the Cuerpo Superior de Policía (Superior Police Corps).

As its other function was traffic and road safety, its duties in all national highways outside the metropolitan areas ended in June 1959, when the Civil Guard took over.

Human rights abuses

The Policía Armada, together with the Guardia Civil, became notorious during the decades of Francoism for its ruthless methods and for widespread human rights abuses against its victims. Indiscriminate beatings of detainees and torture, with or without interrogation, were commonplace in the many police stations (Comisarías) as well as in the headquarters of the Armed Police. Interrogations usually included a member of the Brigada Político-Social, the Francoist political repression wing. The brutal image of the Spanish police would be so pervasive that it has continued to haunt the National Police Corps that replaced the Policía Armada following the Spanish Transition to this day.

Ranks
The ranks and insignia of the Policía Armada displayed its military character and structure. When the National Police Corps replaced it in 1979, it would take 7 years before the rank system was replaced.

Officers

Non-commissioned ranks

Vehicles

The Armed Police used different types of vehicles until its disbandment in 1978. Their registration plates had the letters FPA (Fuerzas de Policía Armada) in black over white.

The Mobile Units (Banderas Móviles) used the following vehicles:
 Land Rover Santana S-II four-wheel drive vehicles
 Land Rover Santana S-III four-wheel drive vehicles in their short and long versions
 Avia buses
 Ebro B-45 trucks
 Sanglas 400 motorcycles

The General Reserve Companies (Compañías de Reserva General) used the following:
 Avia 1250 vans
 Büssing riot water cannons
 Dodge tankettes
 DKW N1000 vans

The Garrison Units (Banderas de Guarnición) were equipped with:
 SEAT 1400 cars
 SEAT 1500 cars
 SEAT 124 station wagon cars
 Sava J4 patrol wagons
 Traffic patrol bicycles

The Cavalry Platoons (Caballería) used Avia 2500 trucks that could carry four horses each for their anti-riot operations, troops were only armed with batons and pistons while sporting lances for ceremonial parades.

See also
Carabineros
Guardia Civil
Guardia de Asalto
Cuerpo General de Policía
Political repression
White Terror (Spain)

References

External links

The Grises charging in Vitoria in 1976
Himno de la Policia Armada- Los Grises
Spanish Police Badges

Military history of Spain
Defunct law enforcement agencies of Spain
1939 establishments in Spain
1978 disestablishments in Spain
Political repression in Spain
Specialist law enforcement agencies of Spain